CS Sănătatea Servicii Publice Cluj, commonly known as Sănătatea Cluj, or simply Sănătatea, is a Romanian professional football club from Cluj-Napoca, Cluj County, Romania, founded in 1986. They currently play in the Liga III.

Performances 

 Promoted to the Liga III in 2005.

The club's greatest performance was when it reached the round of 16 of the Romanian Cup in the 2007–2008 season.

The team was also given the medal Surpriza Cupei României (The Surprise of the Romanian Cup) in the 2007–2008 season.

Honours 
Liga IV – Cluj County
Winners (1): 2004–05

Players

First-team squad

Out on loan

Club officials

Board of directors

Current technical staff

League history

External links
Official website

Sport in Cluj-Napoca
Football clubs in Cluj County
Association football clubs established in 1986
Liga III clubs
Liga IV clubs
1986 establishments in Romania
Works association football clubs in Romania